Grey Mabhalani Bango (born Southern Rhodesia, now Zimbabwe),son of Luposwa Bango, was a trade-unionist and chief of the Kalanga people of Matopos. He is best known for guiding Joshua Nkomo, leader of the Zimbabwe African Peoples Union (ZAPU) through the shrines of the Matopos Hills (now Matobo National Park) during Nkomo’s legendary 1953 visit to Dula.

Joshua Nkomo wrote:

According to legend, Nkomo heard a voice from the shrine addressing him and his guides by name, and asking them what they wanted.

Grey Bango is the father of DJ, journalist and radio programmer Robert Dumakude Bango, who escaped the then unrecognised state of Rhodesia to London in 1974.

References

Possibly living people
Zimbabwean trade unionists